The Military Affairs Commission (MAC) of the National Government, chaired by Generalissimo Chiang Kai-shek during the Second Sino-Japanese War and World War II, directed the command of the National Revolutionary Army of the Republic of China.

Organizational structure 
It was reorganized beginning on January 17, 1938, in the following way:
 Chairman - Chiang Kai-shek
 Military Commissioners
 Chief of the General Staff - He Yingqin
 Board of Military Operations
 Ministry of War
 Board of Military Training
 Board of Political Training
 Directorate General of Courts Martial
 Commission on Aeronautical Affairs
 Military Personnel Bureau
 Military Advisory Council
 Main Office of the Military Affairs Commission
 Aides Office
 Investigation Statistics Bureau
 Councillors Office
 Commanders of Military Regions
 Commander in Chief, Navy
 Commander in Chief, Air Force
 Rear Area Services Department
 Air Defense Commanders
 Garrison Commanders

List of leaders

References 

 Hsu Long-hsuen and Chang Ming-kai, History of The Sino-Japanese War (1937–1945) 2nd Ed., 1971. Translated by Wen Ha-hsiung, Chung Wu Publishing; 33, 140th Lane, Tung-hwa Street, Taipei, Taiwan, Republic of China. pp. 314-316.

External links 
 

National Revolutionary Army
China
Defence agencies of China